Moumina Houssein Darar, is a Djiboutian Anti-Terrorism police investigator. She was recognised as a Woman of Courage by the American Secretary of State in 2019.

Life  
Moumina Houssein Darar was the eldest of a family of eight children. After obtaining a degree in English in 2012, she joined the ranks of the Djibouti Police in 2013. She soon specialized in anti-terrorism investigations as a senior investigator. She was involved in high-profile investigations that resulted in the conviction  or expulsion of many Al-Shabaab terrorists. This allowed the Djiboutian National Police (DNP) to thwart several planned terrorist attacks following the attack of La Chaumière, in 2014 in Djibouti.

She has created a neighborhood charity to help children in need, as well as to provide other services and assistance to help the local community.

She received on 7 March 2019 the Woman of Courage award by Mike Pompeo, the US Secretary of State.

References

1990 births
Djiboutian women
Djiboutian police officers
Women police officers
Living people
People from Ali Sabieh Region
Recipients of the International Women of Courage Award